Gwyn Morgan (born 28 May 1954) is a Welsh-language author.

Background and career

Born and raised in Trecynon near Aberdare, as the only son of Gilbert and Margaret Morgan.

He was educated at Ysgol Gymraeg Ynyslwyd, Aberdâr, Ysgol Gyfun Rhydfelen, Pontypridd; and Trinity College, Carmarthen.

He has been a teacher in Ysgol Gymraeg Gilfach Fargoed and in Ysgol Gymraeg Ynyslwyd, Aberdar.   He currently works as 
an advisory teacher with a company in Trefforest.

He is married to Joyce [Morgan] who was head of the Welsh department at Blaengwawr Comprehensive School. His stepson is the Welsh Nationalist academic, Dafydd Trystan Davies.

He published his first poem in Y Faner in 1976.

He lives near the small village of Penderyn.

Bibliography
Dannedd Gosod Ben (Gwasg y Dref Wen) 1989
Caliban a Cherddi eraill (Gomer) 1993
Zac yn y Pac (Gwasg y Dref Wen) 1994 gyda Dai Owen
Rwba Dwba (Dref Wen) 1995
Hari Hyll yr Ail (Dref Wen) 1996
Ben ar ei Wyliau (Dref Wen) 1996
Y Paffiwr a cherddi eraill (Gomer)1997
Zac yn Grac (Gwasg y Dref Wen) 1999 gyda Dai Owen
Llew Lletchwith (Gwasg y Dref Wen) 2000
Jazz (Gwasg y Dref Wen) 2001
Psst (Gwasg y Dref Wen) 2002
Abracadabra (Dref Wen) 2002
Isi a'r Cloch (Gwasg y Dref Wen) 2003
Twpsyn (Gwasg y Dref Wen) 2004
Babi Ben (Gwasg y Dref Wen) 2004
Ailgylchu Alwyn (Gwasg y Dref Wen) 2005
Tu Chwith (Dref Wen) 2006
Jocs Gwirion Gwyn a Dai (Gwasg Carreg Gwalch) 2006
Posau Gwallgo (Dref Wen) 2007
Dyg a Def Diawledig (Gwasg y Dref Wen) 2011

Gweithdai
 Gweithdy Ysgrifennu Creadigol, Merthyr Tudful, Ebrill 2012
 Gweithdai Ysgrifennu Creadigol yn Ynys Mon, Mawrth 2012
 Gweithdy Ysgrifennu creadigol ag Ysgol Gymraeg Llantrisant, Hydref 2012.
 Sgwad Sgwennu – Merthyr Tudful Hydref 2012
 Writing workshop – Histories and Mysteries – Merthyr Tudful October 2012
 Sgwad Sgwennu – Prifysgol y Drindod/Dewi Sant, Caerfyddin, Tachwedd 2012.
 Writing workshop – Twynyrodyn, Merthyr Tudful, December 2013.
 Gweithdy barddoniaeth yn Ysgol Gymraeg Cwm Garw, Mawrth 2013

References

1954 births
Living people
People from Aberdare
Welsh-language poets
People educated at Ysgol Gyfun Garth Olwg